Lipographis is a genus of snout moths described by Émile Louis Ragonot in 1887.

Species
 Lipographis fenestrella (Packard, 1873)
 Lipographis truncatella (Wright, 1916)
 Lipographis umbrella (Dyar, 1908)

References

Phycitinae
Taxa named by Émile Louis Ragonot
Pyralidae genera